IL-9 can refer to:

 Interleukin 9
 Illinois' 9th congressional district
 Illinois Route 9